Amazon Astro, often shortened to Astro, is a home robot developed by Amazon.com, Inc. It was designed for home security monitoring, remote care of elderly relatives, and as a virtual assistant that can follow a person from room to room.

Features
Tom's Guide called the device "Alexa on wheels" and everything available on the Amazon Echo Show 10 is on this new device. The Astro has visual ID and should be able to recognize different family members and send an alert if the device sees someone in the home it does not recognize.

In 2022, Amazon announced a pilot program connecting Astro to the Ring security system, allowing workers in a remote call centre to control Astro to investigate security alerts.

Hardware

Reception 
Mark Gurman of Bloomberg News says that, six months after its release, hardly anyone was talking about Astro online, and that Amazon had shipped only a few hundred units, at most.
David Priest of CNET observes that "For now, this robot remains a luxury item, for people with a lot of money to try out a cutting-edge technology that still lacks a compelling use case."
Lauren Goode of Wired magazine labels Astro as "a robot for the sake of a robot" and "a robot without a cause, at least for now".

The announcement in September 2022 that Astro would function as a security guard connected to Ring security devices for homes and small businesses led Gizmodo to comment on the increasing "creepiness" of Astro.

See also
Smart speaker

References

Astro
Products introduced in 2021
Robots
2021 robots